Balneario Buenos Aires is a resort in the Maldonado Department of southeastern Uruguay.

Geography
It borders the resort Manantiales to the west, while  to its east is the small resort Edén Rock.

Population
In 2011 Balneario Buenos Aires had a population of 1,551 permanent inhabitants and 1,233 dwellings.
 
Source: Instituto Nacional de Estadística de Uruguay

References

External links
INE map of San Vicente, Edén Rock and Balneario Buenos Aires
Balneario Buenos Aires Official WebSite

Populated places in the Maldonado Department
Seaside resorts in Uruguay